The Wilshire Stakes is a  Grade III American Thoroughbred horse race for fillies and mares age three and older. The race runs over a distance of one mile (8 furlongs) on turf track and is scheduled annually in May at Santa Anita Park in Arcadia, California.

History

The event was inaugurated on 30 June 1953 as the Wilshire Mile a one-mile race on dirt for three-year-old fillies that was won by the British bred filly Ria Rica in an upset victory in the time of 1:37 before a Tuesday crowd of 23,158.

It was not run again until 1963, when it was revived as an event called the Wilshire Handicap that included older fillies and mares over 7 furlongs. The first running of the event on turf was in 1970 as the Wilshire Stakes.  In 1973 the event was run in two divisions.

Beginning with the 2014 running, it was moved to Santa Anita Park due to Hollywood Park's closure and renamed to Wilshire Stakes.

The event has had several distance changes with the current distance set at one mile in 1998.

The event was classified as a Grade III in 1975 and upgraded to Grade II in 1983. It was downgraded in 1998 to Grade III.

The 1968 and 1969 American Champion Older Female Horse Gamely is the only horse to win this event twice. 
In 1989 United States Racing Hall of Fame trainer Charles E. Whittingham trained all the three placegetters in the event – winner Claire Marine (IRE), Fitzwilliam Place finished second and 1987 winner Galunpe third.

Records
Speed  record:  
 1 mile: 1:33.03 – Enola Gray (2017)
  miles: 1:39.00 – Claire Marine (IRE) (1989)

Margins: 
  lengths – Mademoiselle Forli  (1983)

Most wins:
 2 – Gamely (1968, 1969)

Most wins by an owner:
 3 – William Haggin Perry (1967, 1968, 1969)

Most wins by a jockey:
 6 – Chris McCarron (1978, 1985, 1989, 1997, 2000, 2002)

Most wins by a trainer:
 3 – Neil D. Drysdale (1999, 2019, 2020)
 3 – Ben D. A. Cecil (2000, 2010, 2012)
 3 – Robert J. Frankel (1987, 1994, 1995)
 3 – Richard E. Mandella (1977, 1990, 2004)
 3 – Charles E. Whittingham (1974, 1983, 1989)
 3 – Farrell W. Jones (1963, 1964, 1972)
 3 – James W. Maloney (1967, 1968, 1969)

Winners

 
 

Notes:

§ Ran as part of an entry

See also
 List of American and Canadian Graded races

References

Horse races in California
Mile category horse races for fillies and mares
Graded stakes races in the United States
Grade 3 stakes races in the United States
Recurring sporting events established in 1953
Santa Anita Park
1953 establishments in California
Turf races in the United States